The Maine Monster is the nickname of the left-field wall at Hadlock Field in Portland, Maine, which is the home of the Portland Sea Dogs, a double-A affiliate of  the Boston Red Sox. It is similar to the Green Monster at the Red Sox' home, Fenway Park.

Dimensions 
The Maine Monster is 315 feet from home plate along the foul lines. It is 160 feet long and made of wood. Like the Green Monster, it is 37 feet high and green. There is a 12-foot screen above the wall to catch home run balls.

Seats cannot be added to the Maine Monster because there is a railroad track running immediately behind it.

* Height of Green Monster screen is from before the screen was taken down when the Green Monster seats were added

History 
On September 18, 2002 the Portland Sea Dogs announced a new affiliation with the Boston Red Sox after nine years of affiliation with the Florida Marlins. To help train future Red Sox left fielders for the Green Monster and to add character to the ballpark, a likeness of the Green Monster was built. Construction started on October 28, 2002. The name, Maine Monster, was chosen from a contest of fans.

Advertisements 
Most of the advertisements on the Maine Monster are similar to those on the Green Monster. Next to the scoreboard on both walls, there is a W.B. Mason sign.  Above the Maine Monster there are miniature versions of Fenway's Coke bottles and Citgo. In place of the Green Monster's Jimmy Fund logo, there is a sign for TD Banknorth's "Strike Out Cancer in Kids" program. Unique to Portland's stadium are the Hannaford and Sullivan Tire signs above the Maine Monster.

The scoreboard 
Unlike the scoreboard on the Green Monster, which is manually operated from inside the wall, the scoreboard on the Maine Monster is electronic. Along both sides of the scoreboard are the initials of Sea Dogs' owner Dan Burke and his wife in Morse code. This is just like the Green Monster scoreboard which does the same thing with former Red Sox owner Tom Yawkey and his wife.

References 
Seadogs.com History Page 
Seadogs.com Hadlock Field Page 

Baseball in Portland, Maine